Atithee is a 1978 Bollywood romantic drama film directed by Aravind Sen. The film stars Shashi Kapoor, Shatrughan Sinha. The movie was based on the 1971 Bengali movie Ekhane Pinjar.

Cast
 Shashi Kapoor as Anand 
 Shabana Azmi as Leela / Julie 
 Shatrughan Sinha as Navendu Kumar 
 Vidya Sinha as Meena / Martha 
 Utpal Dutt as Avinash Gupta 
 Mac Mohan as Abdullah 
 Deven Verma as Station Master 
 Bharat Bhushan as Mohan Kumar 
 Urmila Bhatt as Mrs. Mohan Kumar 
 Gayatri as Rajni 
 Mehmood Jr. as Kundan Kumar
 Viju Khote as Train passenger

Soundtrack
Lyrics: Verma Malik

External links
 

1978 films
1970s Hindi-language films
Films scored by Kalyanji Anandji